The Royal Canadian Air Force Pipes and Drums (RCAFPD) is a military pipe band unit composed of current members of the Royal Canadian Air Force. The unit was formally established in October 1949 and is the longest continuous serving Air Force Pipe Band in the Canadian Forces. All of its 40 members are volunteers who are drawn from both the military and civilian sphere. At the time of its foundation, it was known as the RCAF Station Rockcliffe Pipe Band.

Operations
The band usually performs for RCAF change of command ceremonies, military funerals, and other major occasions in the National Capital Region. Each year, band leads the Remembrance Day parade in Ottawa near the National War Memorial, and even provides a lone piper to play Lament during the honors ceremony. It has participated in all RCAF Presentation of Colours ceremonies, whether it be official such as the ceremony in 2017 in Toronto, as well as a symbolic presentation of the old RCAF colours at Air Canada Centre to the Toronto Maple Leafs. During the latter, the two pipers from the band took part in the ceremony while the band was in full composition during the former. The band took part in a 75th anniversary ceremony on Parliament Hill in recognition of the Battle of Britain in September 2015. In 2018, the band took part in the Virginia International Tattoo. It celebrated its platinum jubilee in the fall of 2019.

Uniforms

The Pipe Band wear a modified highland dress that features Scottish uniforms augmented with a kilt patterned in the RCAF Tartan. The tartan was created in 1942 by Captain Elmer Fullerton from the No. 9 Service Flying Training School RCAF. He wanted the tartan to reflect his Scottish heritage for his station band. It was approved by the Air Council and was subsequently sent to the Lord Lyon King of Arms on 13 July 1942 to request it become the official RCAF tartan.

Notable members
Thomas J. Brown, pipe major from October 2010 to 2015.
Jack Gauthier, a 58-year veteran of the band and a member of the Ottawa Police Service Pipe Band.

See also
 Royal Canadian Air Force Band
 Central Band of the Canadian Armed Forces

References

Bands of the Royal Canadian Air Force
Musical groups established in 1949
1949 establishments in Canada
Canadian Armed Forces
Organizations established in 1949
Pipe bands
Scottish music